Dejene Debela Gonfa (born 9 January 1995) is an Ethiopian long-distance runner. He won the Xiamen International Marathon both in 2018 and in 2019.

He also won the Beijing Marathon in 2018 and he finished in 2nd place with a personal best of 2:05:46 at the 2019 Chicago Marathon.

Achievements

References 

Living people
1995 births
Ethiopian male long-distance runners
Ethiopian male marathon runners
21st-century Ethiopian people